Educational Organizations are located mainly in Kalpetta and Sultan Battery.

Education in Sulthan Bathery
Many educational institutions including schools, colleges, industrial training centers and teacher training institutes exist in Sulthan Bathery. Wayanad is a single Education District with one Deputy Director of Education, one District Educational Officer (DEO) and three Assistant Educational Officers (AEO). Sulthan Bathery taluk is under one AEO. Wayanad District Institute of Education and Training (DIET) is located at Sulthan Bathery. It is one of the three DIETs established in Kerala in the first phase in 1989. Apart from providing teacher education, its activities include academic research and innovations, academic monitoring of schools and material production.

School Education

Many government, aided and unaided schools exist in Sulthan Bathery. They come under different boards of education such as Kerala State Education Board and Central Board of Secondary Education. Some of the schools which follow the state syllabus are listed below:

List of Schools
 Government High Schools
 Sarvajana GVHSS, Sulthan Bathery
 Moolankavu GHSS, Moolankavu
 GVHS&THS, Sulthan Bathery
 Government High School, Kuppady
 Private Aided High Schools
 Assumption HS, Sulthan Bathery
 St. Mary's College HSS, Kuppady
 Private Unaided High Schools
 St. Joseph's Higher Secondary School, Sulthan Bathery
 WMO English High school, Sulthan Bathery
 Ideal English School, Sulthan Bathery
 Bhavans Vidya Mandir, Sulthan Bathery
 Green hills public school Moolankavu
 Nirmala Matha Public school, Kuppadi
 MC Lords English School Poomala
 Hill Blooms School, Mananthavady

College Education
Compared to other districts of Kerala, institutions offering higher education are limited in Wayanad. One of the oldest colleges in Wayanad is St. Mary's College, Sulthan Bathery, established in 1965. This arts and science college is affiliated to University of Calicut. Another arts and science college located here is Don Bosco College. Pazhassi Raja College, Pulpally, established in 1982, is another major college located nearby.  Government Engineering College located at Mananthavady is the nearest engineering college. It is affiliated to Kannur University.

Two nursing colleges located at Sulthan Bathery are Assumption School of Nursing and Vinayaka Hospital College of Nursing.

Other Educational Institutions
A few distance education centers also exist in the town of Sulthan Bathery. St. Mary's College IGNOU study center offers programs such as Post Graduate Diploma in Rural Development, Post Graduate Diploma in Environmental and Sustainable Development, Diploma in Tourism Studies etc. Another IGNOU study center is at Data Point Computer Academy. It offers programs such as Master of Computer Applications (MCA) and Certificate in Computing (CIC).

Many Teacher Training Colleges (TTC) too are present in Sulthan Bathery. Some of them are Mar Baselios Teacher Training Institute, Valummel Teacher Training Institute, Moolankave and St. George Teacher Training Institute, Pulpally.

Apart from these, some special schools for mentally challenged like St. Gregorios Special School for Mentally Challenged, Kottakkunnu and Mercy Home Sacred Heart Special School for Mentally Retarded exist in Sulthan Bathery. The former is managed by Malankara Orthodox Syrian Church Bathery diocese while the latter is under the District Educational Officer, Wayanad. Other unaided special schools include St. Rossolo's HS for the Deaf, Poomala and WO Blind and Deaf school, Muttil.

Education in Kalpetta

University
 Kerala Veterinary and Animal Sciences University, Pookode (14 km from Kalpetta)

Professional Education 
 College of Veterinary and Animal Sciences at Pookode (14 km from Kalpetta) 
 Oriental School of Hotel Management located at Lakkidi (15 km from Kalpetta)
 Oriental College of Hotel Management and Culinary Arts at Vythiri (8 km from Kalpetta)
 DM WIMS Medical College located at Meppadi (15 km) is the only Medical College in Wayanad district
 College of Dairy Science and Technology, Pookode offers B.Tech degree course in Dairy Science & Technology
 Oriental Institute for Management Studies, Vythiri
 College of Engineering, Thalapuzha, Wayanad 
 DM WIMS Nursing College located at Meppadi 
 Centre for Computer Science and Information Technology of Calicut University at Muttil offers MCA (Master of Computer Application) course
 B.Ed Centre of Calicut University is situated at Kaniyambetta (10 km from Kalpetta)
 Fatima Mata Nursing School, Kalpetta
 Government Polytechnic College, Meppadi
 KMM Government ITI, Kalpetta 
 Face Psycho Clinic and Training Centre (functioning inside Shanthi Pain & Palliative Care Society building) offers Calicut University's Diploma Course in Psychological Counseling

Arts and Science Colleges 
1. Pazhassiraja College, Pulpally
2.[NMSM Government College, Kalpetta]]
3. WMO Arts & Science College, Muttil
4. Green Mount Arts & Science College, Padinjarethara
5. PM Charitable Trust, Arts & Science College, Meppadi

Schools 
 Kendriya Vidyalaya, Kalpetta
 WMO English Academy, Muttil
 SKMJ Higher Secondary School, Kalpetta
 NSS English Medium School, Kalpetta
 De Paul Public School, Kalpetta
 MCF Public School, Kalpetta
 St Joseph's Convent School, Kalpetta
 Government Higher Secondary School, Munderi, Kalpetta
 Al Falah English Medium School, Kalpetta
 Kristhuraja Public School, Vellaramkunnu
 KeyPees International School, Ootty Road, Kunnumbetta

References

Kalpetta area
Education in Wayanad district